Dyctidea is a genus of tropiduchid planthoppers in the family Tropiduchidae. There are about eight described species in Dyctidea.

Species
These eight species belong to the genus Dyctidea:
 Dyctidea angustata Uhler, 1889
 Dyctidea falcata Van Duzee, 1938
 Dyctidea intermedia Uhler, 1889
 Dyctidea nigrata Doering, 1940
 Dyctidea texana O'Brien, 1986
 Dyctidea uhleri Doering, 1940
 Dyctidea valida Doering, 1940
 Dyctidea variegata Van Duzee, 1938

References

Auchenorrhyncha genera
Articles created by Qbugbot
Elicini